Epia intricata is a moth in the family Bombycidae. It was described by Herbert Druce in 1904.

References

Bombycidae
Moths described in 1904